David McLellan may refer to:
 David McLellan (snooker player) (born 1970), Scottish snooker player
 David McLellan (political scientist) (born 1940), British scholar of Marx and Marxism
 David McLellan (Ontario politician) (1841–1892), mayor of Hamilton
 David McLellan (New Brunswick politician) (1839–1894), politician in New Brunswick, Canada
 David McLellan (swimmer) (born 1973), Canadian swimmer
 Dave McLellan, automotive engineer